Whitechapel is a district in London. Associated with it are: 
Whitechapel District (Metropolis)
Whitechapel station
Whitechapel (UK Parliament constituency)
Whitechapel and St Georges (UK Parliament constituency)
Whitechapel Computer Works, a defunct computer company 
Whitechapel Bell Foundry
Whitechapel and Bow Railway
Whitechapel Boys, a group of writers
Whitechapel (TV series), an ITV drama series
Whitechapel (film), a 1920 German silent crime film

Whitechapel may also refer to:

Whitechapel, Lancashire, a small English village
Whitechapel, Liverpool, a street
Whitechapel Manor, Bishops Nympton, Devon
Whitechapel (band), an American deathcore band
Whitechapel (album), their fourth studio album
"Whitechapel", a song and single by S.C.U.M (band)
Whitechapel cart, a light, two-wheeled cart
White Chapel of Senusret I in Egypt